Shields is the name of some places in the U.S. state of Wisconsin:

Shields, Dodge County, Wisconsin, a town
Shields, Marquette County, Wisconsin, a town